Adam Lundegard (born August 8, 2003) is an American soccer player who plays as a defender for  college team Clemson Tigers.

Career 
Lundegaard is an D.C. United Academy product from Huntingtown, Maryland. Lundegaard made his professional debut for Loudoun United on June 8, 2019, starting in a 2-1 loss against Louisville City FC. On January 7, 2020, it was announced that Lundegaard would continue to play for Loudoun in 2020.

References

External links

2003 births
Living people
American soccer players
Association football defenders
Loudoun United FC players
People from Calvert County, Maryland
Soccer players from Maine
Soccer players from Maryland
USL Championship players